Pinoy Auto Trader was an online automotive marketplace primarily catered for the Philippine market. It was owned and operated by Netrepreneur Connections Enterprises and was a sister-company of the Philippine buy and sell website Sulit.com.ph. Pinoy Auto Trader was primarily a business-to-consumer (B2C) website.

History 
Pinoy Auto Trader was founded by Daniel Scott, Christopher Franks and Reynaldo Castellano III as part of Philippine technology startup company SirQo.com, Inc and launched in public beta on November 14, 2012.

In October 2012, prior to the official beta-launch, the Pinoy Auto Trader website was one of eight winners during the inaugural Philippine startup competition Hack2Hatch that was organized and hosted by Filipino Silicon Valley Entrepreneurs Winson Damarillo, Dado Banatao and Paco Sandejas.

Shortly after launch, Pinoy Auto Trader founders met with RJ David, the Co-Founder and Managing Director of Sulit.com.ph to discuss potential collaboration and possible investment opportunities. On February 28, 2013 Pinoy Auto Trader was officially acquired by Netrepreneur Connections Enterprises (Sulit.com.ph). The announcement of the acquisition was made public on July 3, 2013 during an official press conference which also marked the release of version 2.0 of the Pinoy Auto Trader website.

Closure
On January 30, 2014 Pinoy Auto Trader sent out an email to all its dealers announcing the impending closure of the website and business operations on February 7, 2014. It was also stated that the dealers are given this notice to migrate all their car ads onto their mother company, Sulit.com.ph.

On February 7, 2014 Pinoy Auto Trader posted a closure notice on their website announcing the official shutdown and requested all website visitors to proceed to Sulit.com.ph to browse car listings.

Features
Pinoy Auto Trader focuses primarily on the selling experience for trade car dealers by providing microsites which are referred to as online dealer showrooms. These microsites allow dealers to identify car listings as well as highlighting a variety of content such as brand identity, promotions, contact details and social media channels. This service is provided for sellers of both brand new and second-hand vehicles. Used car trade dealers can also access integration features between the Pinoy Auto Trader and Sulit.com.ph websites which allows a used car listing that is posted on Pinoy Auto Trader to automatically repost on Sulit.com.ph.

Pinoy Auto Trader also hosts a new car directory which contains detailed information, technical specifications and prices for every new car available in the Philippines. The new car-directory also provides professional technical car reviews courtesy of Pinoy Auto Trader’s partners at the popular automotive publication C! Magazine.

Other features include a regularly updated blog which hosts information and advice from across the Philippine automotive industry.

References

External links
 Pinoy Auto Trader Website
 Pinoy Auto Trader Official Blog

P
Automotive companies of the Philippines
Online companies of the Philippines
Companies based in Pasig
Online automotive companies